Gennadi Aronovich Vengerov  (27 August 1959 – 22 April 2015) was a Soviet, Russian and German film and theatre actor, narrator and voice-over artist.

Biography 
Vengerov was born on 27 August 1959 in Vitebsk (Belarus). After graduating from the Technical School for Architecture and Construction and a short-term employment as a construction engineer, he started his creative career as an announcer of the Vitebsk Regional Radio. Не performed at the People's Theatre in Vitebsk. In 1980 he was invited to be an actor at the professional scene to the Yakub Kolas Belarus National Academic Drama Theatre.

Following his military service in the Soviet Army in 1983 he entered the School-Studio (Institute of Higher Education) at the Moscow Art Theatre for the course by professors Viktor Monyukov and Vladimir Bogomolov. In 1986, on his 4th course year, together with his course mate Mikhail Yefremov   they established  Sovremennik 2  theatre. In 1989 he was invited to the troop of Moscow Academic Mayakovsky Theatre.

Gennadi Vengerov continued his career in Germany in 1990 as an announcer of Deutsche Welle Radio and an actor of Düsseldorfer Schauspielhaus. From 1995 to 2000 he has been an actor of Bochum Theatre.

Since 2004 he has been actively filming in Russian cinema and TV projects, participated in theatrical productions in Moscow, as voice over talent he made audio records for documentaries, fictional films and advertisements. He is the brand voice of the Russian News Broadcasting Station - RSN and the Russian brand voice Euronews international channel. In 2009 he narrated TV-Show "Men’s Stories with Gennadi Vengerov" on the Russian REN TV channel.

During his career Gennadi Vengerov starred in more than 140 movies in Russia, United States, England, Austria and Germany. At various times he worked with Jude Law, James Cromwell, Sean Bean, Til Schweiger, Christian Slater, Ving Rhames, Mario Adorf, Colm Meaney, Franka Potente, Jan Josef Liefers, Klaus Löwitsch and other famous actors. He is widely known and recognized in Russia for the roles of blacksmith Vulkan (The Fighter series) and Major Volkov (Hour of Volkov series) and among German audience for the role businessman Viktor Strelnikov (Gute Zeiten, schlechte Zeiten).

He died on the morning of 22 April 2015 in Dusseldorf. In memory of the actor was dedicated to the program “Live broadcast with Boris Korchevnikov” (TV channel “Russia-1”) dated 23 April 2015.

Selected filmography 

1987: Story about Nothing as Sheya
1989: Step (Short) as Boris
1989: Deja Vu as Attendant Petrovich
1989: Cursed Days in Russia Again as Major Babakhanov
1991: Lovkach and Khippoza as Boxer
1991:  as SaschaPanewski
1993:  as Worker #3
1992:  (TV Movie) as Kommissar NKWD
1993: Berlin Break (TV Series) as Gregor Iwanowitch
1993: Maus und Katz (TV Movie) as Lubomir Stykov
1993: Mein Mann ist mein Hobby (TV Movie) as Ivan
1993: Westerdeich (TV Series) as Hassan
1993: Brandheiss. Verkehr macht frei (TV Series) as Boris Kasanski
1994: Lutz und Hardy (TV Series) as Holub
1994-1996: Die Stadtindianer (TV Series) as Bubi
1994-1999: Der Fahnder (TV Series) as Carlo / Herbert Kraske / Slavik
1994-2012: Tatort (TV Series) as Arzt / Radovan Jurkic / Alex Barold / Nikita Gurganov
1995: Ein Bayer auf Rügen (TV Series) as Fedor Begulow
1995-1998: Die Straßen von Berlin (TV Series) as Stevic / Mischa / Smocking
1996: Mona M.: So nicht, Frau Staatsanwalt (TV Series) as Oleg Petjuschkin
1996: Jailbirds as Atom Otto
1996: Der Mörder und die Hure (TV Movie) as Piotr
1996: Die Drei (TV Series) as Wladimir
1996: Ein flotter Dreier (TV Series) as Boris
1996: Die Wache (TV Series) as Myschkin
1996: Rache ist süss (TV Movie) as Alex
1996: The Writing on the Wall (TV Movie) as General Timoshkin
1996: The Last Courier (TV Movie) as Bunin (uncredited)
1996: Bockerer II as General Alexandrov
1996:  (TV Series) as Heinz
1997:  as Manfred Manner 
1997: Der kleine Mogler as Zirkusdirektor
1997-2003: Ein Fall für zwei (TV Series) as Stefan Lerch / Stan Czermak
1997: Parkhotel Stern (TV Series) as Demidov
1997-1998: Balko (TV Series) as Khaled / Mehnert
1998: Geliebter Gegner (TV Movie) as Mikhail Krimov
1999:  (TV Series) as Oleg
1999: Die Blendung (TV Movie) as Ralf Eger
1999: Klinikum Berlin Mitte (TV Series) as Trainer
2000: Anatomy as Präparator
2000: Der letzte Zeuge (TV Series) as Boris (uncredited)
2000: OP ruft Dr. Bruckner (TV Series) as Artjom Tarassov
2000: Zwei Brüder (TV Series) as Juri Jaschwili
2000:  (TV Mini-Series) as Major Jenukidze
2001: Enemy at the Gates as Starshina
2001: HeliCops – Einsatz über Berlin (TV Series) as Sergej Romanow
2001: The Tanker (TV Movie) as Bootsmann Shelikov
2001: Der Clown (TV Series) as Tschernik
2001: Im Namen des Gesetzes (TV Series) as Peter Bock
2001: Das Amt (TV Series) as Igor Topolev
2001: Mr. Boss (TV Series) as Marat Bayramov
2002: Edel und Starck (TV Series) as Onkel Melis
2002: Zwei Engel auf Streife (TV Series) as Maxim Oblomov
2002: Erkan und Stefan gegen die Mächte der Finsternis as Möllner
2003: Ohne Worte (TV Series) as Trainer
2003: Crazy Race (TV Movie) as Tsintatses
2003: Alles Atze (TV Series) as 'Milla' Millanowski
2004: The Blindflyers as Russian with beard
2004: Unter Brüdern (TV Series) as Boris
2004: Moscow Heat as Senator Shishov
2004: The Fighter as Blacksmith Vulkan
2004: Swan Heaven as Nikolay Yegorovich
2004-2005: Gute Zeiten, schlechte Zeiten (TV Series) as Viktor Strelnikov
2005: Tmunot Matzkhikot as Alik
2005: Girls as Boris Ortenberg
2005: The Blind 2 (TV Series) as Pavel
2005: You is Me (TV Series) as Zimmer
2006: Die Camper (TV Series) as Sergej
2006: Goldene Zeiten as Sergey
2006: Ladyland (TV Series) as Tracker Karl
2006: Schimanski (TV Series) as Jannis
2006: Mustang (not finished) as Counselor
2006: Maltese Cross as Terminator
2006: Who's the Boss as Restaurant owner
2007: Holy Cause as Modest Morozovskiy
2007: Hour of Volkov (TV Series) as Major Volkov
2007: The Fighter: Birth of the Legend as Blacksmith Vulkan
2007: One Family as Khan
2008: The Sea Wolf (TV Movie) as Turner
2008: Jazo as Boss
2008: Im Angesicht des Verbrechens (TV miniseries) as Major
2008: Criminal Video-2 as Ivan Sergeyev
2008: To the Sea! as Narrator (voice)
2008: The Inhabited Island as Narrator (voice)
2009: Dark Planet as   Narrator (voice)
2009: Clouds above Hills (TV Series) as Admiral Yevgeni Ivanovich Alekseyev
2009: Überlebensstrategien für das neue Jahrtausend as Vater Vostok, Onkel Vostok
2009: The Last Secret of Mater (TV Series) as Petr Ivanovich Lomov
2009: Churchill: Death in Humidor as Pasha Silkov
2009: Hold-up as Cop
2009: The Inhabited Island. Skirmish as Narrator (voice)
2011: Quarter as Sergey Semenov
2010: Traumfabrik as Ernesto
2010: Nick of Time (TV Series) as Mikhalych
2010: Date as Moloch
2010: Juggler-2 as Pavel Voronov
2010: Traffic Cops (TV Series) as Prokhor Yasenev
2010: Beyond Law as Andrey Scherbakov
2010: Alibi for Two as Smolov
2010: Mother under the Contract as Christoph
2010: So oder so! as Eduard
2010: Danni Lowinski (TV Series) as Blumenhändler
2011: Theo (Short) as Narrator (voice)
2011: Investigating Committee (TV Series) as Colonel Salamov
2011: Wunder Punkt (Short) as Witek
2011: Hotel Lux as Upit
2011: Police Speaking (TV Series) as Eduard Burov
2011: Unreal Story as Gruppenführer Stoltz, Tatarian Idris
2011: Gulchatay as Bay Alisher
2011: Policemen Comrades (TV Series) as Dmitriy Veshnyakov
2012:  as Askisischer Beamter
2012: Soldiers of Fortune as Colonel Lupo
2012:  (TV Movie) as Terbent Khan
2012: Poka as Sergej Michajlowitsch Paschkin
2012: Unreal Story 2 as Tatarian Idris
2012: Der Sarg as Marcel
2012:  (TV Movie) as Vladimor
2013:  as Vater Sokolow
2013: Heads or Tails as Therapist
2013: Widows as Arkadiy Markovich
2013: Double Blues as Colonel Ivan Yuriyevich Sosnovskiy
2013: HB Show as Igor Sergeyevich
2013: Adi as Aloiz
2013: Gulchatai 2 as Alisher
2013: A Man without Past as Colonel Petrov
2013: The Way of the Leader: Fire River as Narrator (voice)
2013: The Way of the Leader: Iron Mountain as Narrator (voice)
2013: Kathedralen der Kultur as Narrator (voice)
2014: Blast from the Past as Georgich
2014: Department as Komarov
2014: I Go to Save People as Lieutenant Colonel Baratov
2014: ED (Short) as Miro
2014: Borgia (TV Series) as Gabriel de Guzmann (final appearance)

Roles in theatre 
1980 — Ivan-Svitannik, Galina Korzhanevskaya. Director: Valeriy Mazynskiy — Ivan-Vechernik —  Yakub Kolas Belarus National Academic Drama Theatre  
1981 — Eternity Call, Hodar Dumbadze. Director: Valeriy Maslyuk — Chekist —  Yakub Kolas National Academic Drama Theatre
1986 — Sense Plot/Cuff, Yuriy Olesha. Director: Mikhail Yefremov  — Andrey Babichev — Sovremennik 2
1987 — The Seventh Labor of Hercules, Viktor Roschin. Director: Roman Heidze — Augeas/Crier — Sovremennik 2
1989 — Sunser, Isaak Babel.Director: Andrey Goncharov — Bobrynetz — Mayakovsky Theatre
1989 — Rumor, Afanasiy Salynskiy. Director:  Andrey Goncharov  — Pavel Fryazin — Mayakovsky Theatre
1989 — Rosencrantz and Guildenstern Are Dead, Tom Stoppard. Director: Yevgeniy Arye— Chamberlain — Mayakovsky Theatre
1991 — Die schöne Fremde, Klaus Pohl. Director: Dimitr Gotcheff — Pole — Düsseldorfer Schauspielhaus
1992 — Prometheus Bound, Aeschylus. Director: Herbert König — Bia — Düsseldorfer Schauspielhaus
1993 — A Midsummer Night's Dream, William Shakespeare. Director: David Mukhtar-Samurai — Chamberlain — Düsseldorfer Schauspielhaus
1995 — Fatherlessness, Anton Chekhov. Director: Leander Haussmann — Bugrov — Schauspielhaus Bochum
1995 — Brawling in Chioggia, Carlo Goldoni. Director: Leander Haussmann — Canocchia — Schauspielhaus Bochum
1996 — Germany 3,Heiner Müller. Director: Leander Haussmann — Stalin — Schauspielhaus Bochum
1996 — Diva, Dirk Dobrou. Director: Gil Mehmert — Wolfgang Becker — Schauspielhaus Bochum
1996 — The Taming of the Shrew, William Shakespeare. Director: Leander Haussmann — Magister — Schauspielhaus Bochum
1997 — Dolphin Cry, Ivan Okhlobystin. Director:  Mikhail Yefremov — Ivan —   Sovremennik Theatre
2008 — MusicBox, AndreyPlatonov. Director: Mikhail Yefremov — agent of sovkhoz —  Sovremennik Theatre
2009 — Das Leben des Siegfried, John von Düffel. Director: Gil Mehmert — Tuborg, king of Denmark — Nibelungenfestspiele Worms, Germany

References

External links

Russian press
 Интервью c Геннадием Венгеровым
 Актёр Геннадий Венгеров о том как играть военных и «оборотней в погонах»

21st-century Russian male actors
21st-century German male actors
1959 births
2015 deaths
20th-century German male actors
German male stage actors
Soviet male stage actors
German male film actors
German male television actors
Russian male film actors
Russian male stage actors
Russian male television actors
Moscow Art Theatre School alumni
People from Vitebsk
Deaths from lung cancer in Germany
Radio and television announcers
Russian television presenters